The South Barrule is the highest hill in the south of the Isle of Man. It has the remains of a fort on its summit, which is traditionally the home of the Manx god of the sea Mannanan beg mac y Leir. The hill is largely surrounded by conifer plantations. On the south western slope of the hill the Cringle Reservoir was formed to supply water to the southern part of the island. South Barrule's ancient name was Warfield or Wardfell.

A short, straight footpath links the summit with a small saddle known as the Round Table, through which pass the Bayr ny Skeddan walking route, the A27 Colby to Peel road and the A36 Sloc road.

There is also a North Barrule in the Isle of Man. The word Barrule features in the Manx national anthem, in which the Island is said to be "firm as Barrule".

References

External links 
 South Barrule 
 South Barrule Celtic Hillfort

Marilyns of the Isle of Man
Mountains and hills of the Isle of Man